June 2010 Rehearsal is an extended play by the American rock band Primus released on August 5, 2010 worldwide. The EP has been released digitally from Primus' official website for free. It is the first Primus release to feature original drummer Jay Lane, who left the band before their debut, Suck on This.

Track listing

Personnel
Les Claypool – bass guitar, vocals
Larry LaLonde – guitar
Jay Lane – drums, percussion

External links
 Primus official website

Primus (band) EPs
2010 EPs
Prawn Song Records EPs
Albums free for download by copyright owner
Self-released EPs